The 2019 Wychavon District Council election took place on 2 May 2019 to elect members of Wychavon District Council. This was on the same day as other local elections. The entire council (45 seats) was up for election. The Conservatives lost 5 seats (2 to the Liberal Democrats, 2 to the Green Party, and 1 to an independent), and gained 2 seats (1 from the Liberal Democrats, and 1 held defection from UKIP), bringing their total on the council to 36. 7 wards (Bretforton & Offenham, Dodderhill, Eckington, Harvington & Norton, Inkberrow, Norton and Whittington, and South Bredon Hill) did not hold a vote, as an equal number of candidates ran as seats available.

Summary

Election result

|-

UKIP lost a seat which is not shown in the table above as they stood no candidates at this election.

Results by ward

Badsey

Bengeworth

Bowbrook

Bredon

Bretforton and Offenham

No contest was held here, as just 1 candidate ran for the seat.

Broadway and Wickhamford

Dodderhill

No contest was held here, as just 1 candidate ran for the seat.

Drakes Broughton

Droitwich Central

Droitwich East

Droitwich South East

Droitwich South West

Droitwich West

Eckington

No contest was held here, as just 1 candidate ran for the seat.

Elmley Castle and Somerville

Evesham North

Evesham South

Fladbury

Great Hampton

Gerald Bearcroft was the incumbent councillor, having been elected for UKIP in 2015.

Hartlebury

Harvington and Norton

No contest was held here, as just 1 candidate ran for the seat.

Honeybourne and Pebworth

Inkberrow

No contest was held here, as just 2 candidates ran for the 2 seats.

Little Hampton

Lovett and North Claines

Norton and Whittington

No contest was held here, as just 1 candidate ran for the seat.

Ombersley

Pershore

Pinvin

South Bredon Hill

No contest was held here, as just 1 candidate ran for the seat.

The Littletons

Upton Snodsbury

By-elections

Elmley Castle and Somerville

The Littletons

References

Wychavon
May 2019 events in the United Kingdom
Wychavon District Council elections